Cattleya Orchid and Three Hummingbirds (1871) is an oil on mahogany panel picture by Martin Johnson Heade acquired by the National Gallery of Art in 1982. Inspired perhaps by the works of Charles Darwin and Frederic Edwin Church, Heade planned to produce a deluxe book in the 1860s depicting Brazilian hummingbirds in tropical settings, and, to that end, created a series of 40 small pictures called The Gems of Brazil. The project was abandoned, but Heade retained his interest in hummingbirds and continued to paint them in combination with orchids and jungle backgrounds through the 1870s. The NGA describes the work: "Lichen covers dead branches; moss drips from trees; and, a blue-gray mist veils the distant jungle. An opulent pink orchid with light-green stems and pods dominates the left foreground." On the right, two green-and-pink Brazilian Amethysts hover about a nest while a red-tailed Sappho Comet perches nearby.

References
 
 fegi-bin/tinfo_f?/object=612448&detail=none NGA: Cattleya Orchid and Three Hummingbirds

Paintings by Martin Johnson Heade
American paintings
1871 paintings
Collections of the National Gallery of Art
Birds in art